"Papa's Got a Brand New Bag" is a song written and recorded by James Brown. Released as a two-part single in 1965, it was Brown's first song to reach the Billboard Hot 100 Top Ten, peaking at number eight, and was a number-one R&B hit, topping the charts for eight weeks. It won Brown his first Grammy Award, for Best Rhythm & Blues Recording.

Consolidating the rhythmic innovations of earlier James Brown recordings such as "I've Got Money" and "Out of Sight", "Papa's Got a Brand New Bag" is considered seminal in the emergence of funk music as a distinct style. As Brown sings the praises of an old man brave enough to get out on the dance floor of a nightclub ("brand new bag" meaning new interest, taste, or way of doing something), his band provides a horn-heavy backdrop with a prominent rhythm and an electric guitar riff for a hook. Both singer and musicians place overwhelming emphasis on the first beat of each measure ("on the One"). The song is Brown's first recording to feature Jimmy Nolen on guitar.

The taped recording of "Papa's Got a Brand New Bag" was edited and sped up for its single release, increasing the tempo and raising the pitch by a half step. In 1991, the recording was released in unedited form at its original speed on the box set Star Time. The track includes lead-in studio chatter, with Brown throatily (and presciently) shouting "This is a hit!" just before the drum and horn intro.

Legacy 
In 2004, "Papa's Got a Brand New Bag" was ranked number 72 on Rolling Stone magazine's list of the 500 greatest songs of all time. (In 2010, the magazine updated its list, and the song was moved up a rank to number 71.) The song is currently ranked as the 121st greatest song of all time, as well as the eighth-best song of 1965, by Acclaimed Music.

Other recordings 
An instrumental version of "Papa's Got a Brand New Bag" was released as the B-side of Brown's 1965 single from Smash called "Try Me". He also recorded a big band jazz arrangement of the song with Louie Bellson's Orchestra for his 1970 album Soul on Top.

Live performances of "Papa's Got a Brand New Bag" appear on the albums Hot on the One, Live in New York, Soul Session Live, Live at the Apollo 1995, and the 2009 Expanded Edition of Live at the Garden. It is also featured in medleys on Love Power Peace and Say It Live and Loud.

Cover versions 
 In 1965, The Fabulous Echoes covered the song on their album Lovin' Feeling.
 In 1965, Buddy Guy played the song participating in the European tour American Folk Blues Festival. The song is not on the record but in the movie that was made of the tour.
In 1965, The McCoys released a version of the song on their debut album, Hang on Sloopy.
 In 1968, Atco Records released a single by Otis Redding, from the posthumously released LP In Person at the Whisky a Go Go.
 In 1968, The Watts 103rd Street Rhythm Band released a version of the song on their album, Together.
 In 1971, Fadoul, a Moroccan musician, covered the song in Arabic.
In 1974, The Residents recorded a German version of the song for their Third Reich N Roll album.
 In 1987, Roger Troutman covered the song on his album Unlimited!.
 In 1995, Jimmy Smith recorded an instrumental version on his album Damn!
 In 1999, The Sugarman 3 covered the song on Sugar's Boogaloo.
 In 2006, Bebi Dol covered the song on her album Čovek rado izvan sebe živi.
 In 2007, Ubisoft remake this song for the game Rayman Raving Rabbids 2 covered by Franck Chapelat.
 In 2018, fourteen year-old Courtney Hadwin covered the song in a broadcast performance on NBC's primetime TV show America's Got Talent.

Personnel 
 James Brown – lead vocals

with the James Brown Band:
 Joe Dupars – trumpet
 Ron Tooley – trumpet
 Levi Rasbury – trombone
 Wilmer Milton – trombone
 Nat Jones – alto saxophone
 Maceo Parker – tenor and baritone saxophones
 St. Clair Pinckney – tenor saxophone
 Eldee Williams – tenor saxophone
 Al "Brisco" Clark – tenor saxophone
 Nat Jones – organ
 Jimmy Nolen – guitar
 Sam Thomas or Bernard Odum – bass
 Melvin Parker – drums

Similarly named songs 
 An instrumental recorded by the band Pigbag, "Papa's Got a Brand New Pigbag", was a worldwide hit in 1981.
 In 1995 Paul Oakenfold's Perfecto Allstarz project recorded "Reach Up (Papa's Got A Brand New Pigbag)", which peaked at #6 in the UK Singles Chart.
 The Capitol Steps recorded the parody "Papa's Got A Brand New Baghdad" for their 2004 album of the same name.
 "Lil Poppa Got A Brand New Bag" by rapper Young Bleed released on January 20, 1998.

References and uses in popular culture 
"Papa's Got a Brand New Excuse", an episode of The Fresh Prince of Bel Air, was named for the song. The song's title was also played on for The Simpsons episode "Poppa's Got a Brand New Badge".

The 2013 musical Kinky Boots contains the line "Papa's got a brand new shoe" in the song "Everybody Say Yeah" (music and lyrics by Cyndi Lauper).

Towards the end of one of the mixes of Public Enemy's 1994 song "Give It Up", Flavor Flav is heard to say "Papa's got a brand new bag." The same line is also heard in the rap part of Color Me Badd's 1991 single "Color Me Badd" and Big Daddy Kane's 1989 song "Warm It Up, Kane".

In 1990, the song was featured in an episode of The Wonder Years (season 3, episode 15), "The Tree House". Later it was featured in the 1993 film Mrs. Doubtfire.

A remix of the song was played in the official Season 6 trailer of Call of Duty: Modern Warfare (2019).

In the Eminem song “Just Lose It” one of his lyrics is “Poppa’s got a brand new bag of toys…”

References

External links 
 AllMusic review

1965 songs
1965 singles
Funk songs
Songs written by James Brown
James Brown songs
The McCoys songs
Charles Wright & the Watts 103rd Street Rhythm Band songs
Grammy Hall of Fame Award recipients
King Records (United States) singles
1965 neologisms
Quotations from music